Technological University, Myitkyina is located in Kachin State, Myitkyina City, Myanmar. On 1 September 1997, the high school was upgraded to the Government Technical Institute (G.T.I) level and then on 2 October 1999, it became the Government Technological Colleges (G.T.C) level. On 20 January 2007, it was again upgraded from College to University. On 28 April 2006, transfer to Swe Aike Quarter, Panmtee village and open the new Technological University with the three stories building.

Department

Civil Engineering Department
Electronic Engineering Department
Electrical Power Engineering Department
Mechanical Engineering Department
Engineering English Department
Engineering Mathematics Department
Engineering Physics Department
Engineering Chemistry Department

PROGRAM

See also 
 Technological University (Kalay)

 Technological University, Bhamo

 List of Technological Universities in Myanmar

External links

Technological universities in Myanmar